Jack Bascom Brooks (December 18, 1922December 4, 2012) was an American Democratic Party politician from the state of Texas who served 42 years in the United States House of Representatives, initially representing  from 1953 through 1967, and then, after district boundaries were redrawn in 1966, the  from 1967 to 1995. He had strong political ties to prominent Texas Democrats including Speaker of the House Sam Rayburn and President Lyndon B. Johnson. For over fifteen years, he was the dean of the Texas congressional delegation.

Early life

Brooks was born in Crowley, Louisiana, on December 18, 1922, and moved to Beaumont, Texas, at age5 with his family. When he was 13 his father, a rice salesman, died and among the jobs young Brooks took on were as a carhop and a newspaper reporter. He enrolled in Lamar Junior College in 1939 after receiving a scholarship. After completing two years at Lamar, he transferred to the University of Texas at Austin, from which he earned a Bachelor of Arts in journalism in 1943.

Military service

Brooks enlisted in the U.S. Marine Corps during World War II. He served for about two years on the Pacific islands of Guadalcanal, Guam, Okinawa, and in North China, attaining the rank of first lieutenant. Afterward, he remained active in the U.S. Marine Corps Reserve, retiring in 1972 at the rank of colonel.

Political career

Texas legislature

A lifelong Democrat, Brooks was elected in 1946 to represent Jefferson County in the Texas House of Representatives. After his election he sponsored a bill that would make Lamar Junior College a four-year institution. The bill initially failed, but passed the following year. He won re-election to the state legislature in 1948 without opposition; the following year he earned a law degree from the University of Texas Law School.

U.S. Congress

After four years in the Texas legislature, Brooks won a crowded 12-candidate Democratic primary and then was elected to the U.S. House of Representatives in the 1952 election.

A protégé of fellow Texans, Speaker of the House Sam Rayburn and then-U.S. Senator Lyndon B. Johnson, Brooks showed himself to be a conservative on some issues like the death penalty and gun control, but more liberal on issues like domestic spending, labor, and civil rights. In 1956, he refused to sign the Southern Manifesto that opposed racial integration in public places. Brooks voted against the Civil Rights Acts of 1957 and 1960, but voted in favor of the 24th Amendment to the U.S. Constitution, the Civil Rights Acts of 1964 and 1968, and the Voting Rights Act of 1965. As a member of the House Judiciary Committee, he helped to write the 1964 and 1965 bills.

On November 22, 1963, Brooks was in President John F. Kennedy's Dallas, Texas motorcade at the time Kennedy was assassinated. Hours later, he was present on Air Force One when Lyndon B. Johnson was sworn in as president.

The 2nd was redistricted as the 9th district in 1966, after the Supreme Court ruled in Wesberry v. Sanders that congressional district populations had to be equal or close to equal in population.

One of Brooks's signature bills required competitive bidding for federal computing contracts. Initially conceived in the mid-1960s and enacted into law in 1972, the Brooks Act was the primary rule for all federal computer acquisitions for three decades, and is often cited as being a catalyst for technological advances.

As a member of the House Judiciary Committee, Brooks participated in the 1973–74 impeachment process against Richard Nixon. In mid-July 1974 he drafted and distributed to all members of the committee a strongly-worded set of articles of impeachment. Uncompromising though they were, the Brooks proposals provided others on the committee with an opportunity to meld their thoughts together and to further develop, thus serving as the foundation for the articles of impeachment that the committee subsequently adopted. Because of the part he played in the president's downfall, Nixon later called Brooks his "executioner".

Brooks was one of eight Democrats to vote for all five articles of impeachment brought before the Judiciary Committee. The others were Robert Kastenmeier, Don Edwards, John Conyers, Barbara Jordan, Charles Rangel, Elizabeth Holtzman and Edward Mezvinsky.

Brooks was chairman of the U.S. House Committee on Government Operations from 1975 through 1988, and of the U.S. House Committee on the Judiciary from 1989 until 1995. He also served on the Select Committee on Congressional Operations, the Joint Committee on Congressional Operations, and the Subcommittee on Legislation and National Security. In 1979, he became the senior member of the Texas congressional delegation, a position which he maintained for fifteen years.

As the leader of the Government Operations Committee, Brooks oversaw legislation affecting budget and accounting matters, and the establishment of departments and agencies. He also helped pass the Inspector General Act of 1978, the General Accounting Office Act of 1980, the Paper Reduction Act of 1980, and the Single Audit Act of 1984.

In 1988, Brooks's influence was made prominent by his unusual involvement in trade policy. He introduced a spending bill amendment that banned Japanese companies from U.S. public works projects for one year. He said he was motivated by continuing signs that the Japanese government "intended to blatantly discriminate against U.S. firms in awarding public works contracts". House Majority Leader Tom Foley of Washington, who opposed the amendment, said Brooks "is one of the most powerful and effective chairmen in Congress."

Brooks served twice as a House impeachment manager,  being among the House impeachment managers that successfully prosecuted the cases against Judges Alcee Hastings and Walter Nixon in their 1989 impeachment trials.

While chair of the House Judiciary Committee, Brooks sponsored the Americans with Disabilities Act of 1990, the Omnibus Crime Control Act of 1991, and the Civil Rights Act of 1991. He was also a sponsor of the 1994 Violent Crime Control and Law Enforcement Act, a measure which eventually came to include a ban on assault weapons (the inclusion of which he opposed).

Brooks won re-election in the 1992 election, comfortably defeating his Republican opponent Steve Stockman. Two years later, however, the 21-term incumbent unexpectedly lost to Stockman in the 1994 election, becoming the most senior representative ever to be unseated in a general election, a distinction which he maintains to this day. His tenure had extended across the administrations of 10 U.S. presidents, and he was on the verge of becoming the dean of the U.S. House had he won a 22nd term.

Personal life and death

In 1960, Brooks married Charlotte Collins. They had three children: Jeb, Kate, and Kimberly.

Brooks died at Baptist Hospital in Beaumont on December 4, 2012, two weeks before his 90th birthday.

Legacies and tributes

 In 1978, a U.S. court house and post office in Beaumont, Texas, were renamed the Jack Brooks Federal Building.
 A Galveston County park in Hitchcock is named Jack Brooks Park.
 In 1989, a statue of Brooks was placed in the quadrangle at Lamar University in Beaumont.
 In 2001, NASA presented its Distinguished Service Medal to Brooks at a ceremony in the John Gray Center of Lamar University. NASA Admin. Daniel Goldin cited Brooks's long-standing support of the U.S. space program and his role in "strengthening the agency during its formative years". Goldin said "Congressman Brooks took it upon himself to personally deliver support to one of the agency's key programs: the design, development, and on-orbit assembly of the International Space Station." 
 In 2002, Brooks was named Post Newsweek Tech Media's "Civilian executive of the last twenty years" by Government Computer News.
 In 2008, Brooks donated his archives to the Dolph Briscoe Center for American History of the University of Texas at Austin.
 In 2010, the Southeast Texas Regional Airport was renamed Jack Brooks Regional Airport in Brooks's honor.
 In the 2016 Oscar nominated movie Jackie, he was portrayed by actor David Friszman.

See also

 Texas politics
 Firearms legislation in the U.S.
 Rex 84

Notes and references

External links

 The LBJ Foundation 
 

|-

|-

|-

|-

1922 births
2012 deaths
20th-century American politicians
Democratic Party members of the United States House of Representatives from Texas
Lamar University alumni
Democratic Party members of the Texas House of Representatives
Military personnel from Texas
People from Beaumont, Texas
People from Crowley, Louisiana
United States Marine Corps colonels
United States Marine Corps personnel of World War II
United States Marine Corps reservists
University of Texas School of Law alumni